Paul Kim Ok-kyun (December 9, 1925 – March 1, 2010) was the Roman Catholic titular bishop of Girba and the auxiliary bishop of the Roman Catholic Archdiocese of Seoul, South Korea.

Ordained to the priesthood on December 18, 1954, Kim Ok-kyun was appointed auxiliary bishop of the Seoul Archdiocese on March 9, 1985, and was ordained bishop on April 25, 1985, retiring on December 12, 2001.

Notes

20th-century Roman Catholic bishops in South Korea
20th-century Roman Catholic titular bishops
1925 births
2010 deaths
Roman Catholic bishops of Seoul